Mestre is a borough of the comune (municipality) of Venice, on the mainland opposite the historical island city in the region of Veneto, Italy.

Administratively, Mestre forms (together with the nearby Carpenedo) the Municipalità di Mestre-Carpenedo, one of the six boroughs or districts of the comune. Sometimes it is considered as a frazione. With 88,552 (2019) inhabitants, Mestre is the most populated urban centre of the comune. The population of the borough of Mestre-Carpenedo is 89,373 (2010).

Overview
The mainland of Venice is the territory of on the coast of the Lagoon of Venice, off the Adriatic sea in northeastern Italy. It is connected to Venice proper by a 3,850 m (2.39 miles) long railway and road bridge over the lagoon called Ponte della Libertà (Freedom Bridge).
 
After World War II, Mestre had a fast and disorganized period of urban growth and became a large urban area together with the other urban centers on the Venetian mainland (Carpenedo, Marghera, Favaro Veneto, Chirignago, Zelarino, Tessera). Since Mestre is the hub and the most populated area of the mainland shore, in common parlance its toponym is very often used, incorrectly, to designate the whole Venetian mainland.

Mestre became a comune in 1806 and remained so until 1926, when it was incorporated into the comune of Venice together with adjacent portions of the mainland and islands in the lagoon.

Population
Mestre has around 88,552 inhabitants while the Municipalità di Mestre-Carpenedo (one of the six boroughs of the city of Venice) has 89,373 inhabitants. The whole Venetian mainland (the boroughs of Mestre-Carpenedo, Marghera, Chirignago-Zelarino and Favaro Veneto) has around 181,000 inhabitants.

In contrast, there are just around 53,000 inhabitants in Venice city (San Marco, Castello, Cannaregio, San Polo, Dorsoduro, Santa Croce) and just around 27,700 in the other major islands of Venice city borough (Murano, Burano, Mazzorbo and Torcello) and adjacent multi island borough of Lido Pellestrina, which makes a total of around 80,700 inhabitants based on the islands of the municipality, thus making Mestre Venice municipality's largest population centre with around one third of the total.

Public transport
Public transport is managed by Azienda del Consorzio Trasporti Veneziano. There are several bus routes and two tram lines. Several bus routes link the mainland with piazzale Roma, the main bus station in Venice, via Ponte della Libertà, the bridge which connects Venice to the mainland.

History
According to legend, Mestre was founded by Mesthles, a companion of the hero Antenor, a fugitive from Troy, who founded Padua. The true origins of the town are uncertain, although it is known that a Roman oppidum (fortress) existed here. The settlement was destroyed by Attila and was probably rebuilt in the 10th century.

The first historical attestation of Mestre is in the charter of the Holy Roman Emperor Otto III, in which Rambald, the count of Treviso, received land in an area named Mestre. In 1152 a papal bull by Pope Eugene III recognized the bishop of Treviso as lord of Mestre and mentioned the existence of the church of St. Lawrence, a castle (Castelvecchio, Old Castle) and a port. In 1257 the bishop granted Mestre to Alberico da Romano, the podestà of Treviso. In 1274 a fire destroyed the castle, and Mestre's inhabitants fortified the town with a palisade, which became Castelnuovo (Newcastle). No traces of this castle remain today.

In 1323 the Scaligeri family from Verona conquered Treviso and thus acquired Mestre. The Venetians, fearing the excessive Verona's power in the mainland, conquered Mestre on 29 September 1337. 
They replaced the old fortification with a brick wall with eight towers and a moat. The port of Mestre benefited from the economic power of the Republic of Venice, forming Venice's main connection with the mainland. A canal (the Canal Salso) was built to facilitate the transport of goods.

The Venetian domination of Mestre ended on 16 July 1797 with the occupation of the Republic of Venice by Napoleon. In 1806 Mestre, following the French model, constituted itself into a free municipality. It remained so under the subsequent period of Austrian rule (it also incorporated Carpenedo e Marocco) and under the Kingdom of Italy. In 1923 it was given the status of  town. Three years later a Royal Decree incorporated Mestre and some other neighbouring townships (Chirignago, Zelarino and Favaro Veneto) to the comune of Venice.

Since then there have been attempts to regain autonomy in four referendums in 1979, 1989, 1994 and 2003, but in each instance the proposal for separating Mestre from Venice was rejected. Another such referendum, which was proposed by the president of the Veneto region, took place on 1 December 2019. Even though 66% of the voters voted for the separation only the 21% of the population voted, thus making the referendum not valid.

In the 1960s and 1970s Mestre experienced a population boom, fuelled mainly by the construction of a large industrial zone in nearby Marghera.

Tourism
Mestre is now a favourite starting point for tourists visiting Venice on a budget due to its convenient location, its cheap and frequent connections to Venice by train and by bus (which also runs at night), and the more reasonable prices of its bars, discos, car parking, hotels, restaurants, and supermarkets compared to the prices of the same tourist services in Venice.

In 1979 Mestre provided one of the venues for the European basketball championship EuroBasket 1979. This drew many tourists to the town. The other venues were in Siena, Gorizia and Turin.

Main sights
Duomo of St. Lawrence (17th century)
Palazzo da Re
Palazzo podestarile
Provvedaria
Torre dell'Orologio (Watchtower, 1108)
Train Station (Stazione Ferrovia)

Museums 

 M9 Museum, inaugurated in 2018.

Points of interest 
 Orto Botanico Locatelli, a small botanical garden

In popular culture
Donna Leon's third Commissario (inspector) Guido Brunetti mystery novel, The Anonymous Venetian (1994), aka Dressed for Death, starts with a battered body found behind a slaughterhouse near Marghera — just inside the border of Mestre. The staff of the local inspector is considered inadequate, so Brunetti is assigned to lead the investigation of the Mestre police.

In 2019, Italian-German singer Marco di Colonia released an album completely dedicated to the life and the people of Mestre.

See also 
 A.C. Mestre, the local football (soccer) club, currently playing in Serie C
 Reyer Venezia, a men basketball club nominally representing Venice but playing home games in Mestre, currently in Lega A
 Basket Mestre 1958, another men basketball club that both represents and plays in Mestre, currently in Serie C
 Trams in Mestre

References

External links 

 
 Bacaro Tour Mestre -  History of mestre
 Municipality of Mestre-Carpenedo
 Mestre in the 1900s 
 English team to tour in Mestre

Frazioni of the Metropolitan City of Venice
Geography of Venice
Former municipalities of Veneto